Yizhuang railway station is a railway station on the Beijing–Tianjin Intercity Railway in Taihu, Tongzhou District, Beijing. It lies right next to the Taihu Toll Gate on the S15 Jingjin Expressway. It has been fully built but no trains currently stop at the railway station. Currently, the railway station is not opened.

Beijing Subway

The railway station is served by a subway station on Yizhuang line of the Beijing Subway. The subway station was opened on December 30, 2018. It was opened before the intercity railway station to serve the residents living nearby.

Station Layout 
The station has an underground island platform.

Exits 
There are 2 exits, lettered A and D. Exit A is accessible.

References

Beijing Subway stations in Tongzhou District
Railway stations in Beijing
Railway stations in China opened in 2018